Soul City: A Novel is a 2005 American novel written by Touré.

Plot
In a utopian setting named Soul City, Cadillac Jackson, a reporter for Chocolate City Magazine, arrives in Soul City to cover the mayoral election and falls in love with a woman named Mahogany.

Reception
The Washington Post wrote that the novel was set in an African American utopia.

References

English-language novels
African-American literature
2005 science fiction novels
Utopian novels